Bevenopran (INN, USAN) (former developmental code names CB-5945, ADL-5945, MK-2402, OpRA III) is a peripherally acting μ-opioid receptor antagonist that also acts on δ-opioid receptors and was under development by Cubist Pharmaceuticals for the treatment of chronic opioid-induced constipation. It reached phase III clinical trials for this indication before being discontinued.

See also
 Alvimopan
 Axelopran
 Eluxadoline
 Methylnaltrexone
 Naldemedine
 Naloxegol

References

Amines
Carboxamides
Drugs acting on the gastrointestinal system and metabolism
Laxatives
Mu-opioid receptor antagonists
Peripherally selective drugs
Pyrazines